Sarsa is a village in the Anand district of the Indian state of Gujarat. , the village had 477 households with a total population of 43,294 of which 22,176 were male and 21,118 female.

References

Villages in Kheda district